102nd Heavy Anti-Aircraft Regiment, Royal Artillery, was an air defence unit of Britain's Territorial Army (TA) formed at Antrim, Northern Ireland, during the period of international tension leading up to the outbreak of World War II. It defended Belfast and its shipyards during the early part of the war and then served in the Middle East. The regiment continued in the postwar TA until amalgamated in 1955.

Formation
The Territorial Army was rapidly expanded following the Munich Crisis, particularly the Anti-Aircraft (AA) branch of the Royal Artillery (RA). 102nd Anti-Aircraft Regiment, RA was among the new units raised in 1939: it was still being formed when Anti-Aircraft Command was mobilised on 24 August 1939 in anticipation of war with Germany. The new regiment formed part of 3 AA Brigade defending Northern Ireland in 3rd AA Division, and had the following organisation:
 Regimental Headquarters (RHQ) at Antrim
 314, 315, 316 AA Batteries formed 25 August 1939
 175, 176 Light AA (LAA) Batteries formed and regimented 10 September 1939

World War II
In November 1939, while 102nd AA Rgt was still forming, 3rd AA Bde HQ and some of its units were deployed to France with the British Expeditionary Force (BEF). On 1 June 1940 those AA regiments equipped with 3-inch or heavier guns were termed Heavy Anti-Aircraft (HAA); this included 102nd AA Regiment, despite its hybrid HAA/LAA organisation. By the time 3 AA Bde HQ returned to Belfast after the Battle of France had been lost and the BEF evacuated without its equipment, there were only seven HAA guns to defend the city.

Belfast Blitz

AA Command rapidly expanded during the Battle of Britain and the following Luftwaffe night campaign against UK cities known as the Blitz. Five new AA divisions were created on 1 November 1940, including 12th AA Division, which was formed by separating responsibility for Northern Ireland and the industrial areas of Western Scotland from 3rd AA Division. 3 AA Brigade came under the command of this new formation.

During this period 102nd HAA Rgt was the only HAA unit available to 3 AA Bde. 175 and 176 LAA Batteries left the regiment on 1 December 1940 to form a separate 66th LAA Rgt at Belfast. This regiment later served in the Middle East. 102nd HAA Regiment also provided a cadre of experienced officers and men as the basis of a new 417 HAA Bty formed on 16 January 1941 at 211th HAA Training Rgt at Oswestry in Wales. This later joined 123rd HAA Rgt.

Although its shipyards made Belfast an important target, the city did not receive a major bombing raid until nearly the end of the Blitz, when two attacks on 15 April and 4 May (the Belfast Blitz) caused widespread damage and loss of life. After May 1941, there were only rare incursions by the Luftwaffe, though the strength of 3 AA Bde steadily increased.

Mid-war
There was little change in the mid-war years. On 12 January 1942, 431 HAA Bty joined the regiment from 64th (Northumbrian) HAA Rgt stationed in North East England. The battery moved on to 126th HAA Rgt in the West Country on 10 July 1942.

A reorganisation of AA Command in October 1942 saw the AA divisions disbanded to be replaced by a smaller number of AA Groups more closely aligned with the groups of RAF Fighter Command. Northern Ireland came under a single 7 AA Group HQ and 3 AA Bde was disbanded, several of its units being made available for service elsewhere. 102nd HAA Regiment moved to 37 AA Bde, which operated the 'Thames North' AA layout on the north side of the Thames Estuary protecting London. But by early November it was unbrigaded, and by late February it had left AA Command completely and was on its way to the Middle East.

Middle East
102nd HAA Regiment had joined Middle East Forces (MEF) by late May 1943, and by early July it had been assigned to Ninth Army in Palestine and Syria. At the end of the year 102nd HAA Rgt was part of 1 AA Bde, which was responsible for the Levant area, including Haifa, Homs and Baalbek.

Earlier in the war, Haifa had been an important naval base and oil terminal. However, since the North African Campaign ended in May 1943, MEF had become a military backwater. At the beginning of 1944, the Eastern Mediterranean AA Group began to be run down: the air threat had diminished and the need to provide manpower for combat tasks elsewhere had become urgent. Surplus AA units in the region started to be disbanded; 102nd HAA Rgt was placed in suspended animation on 16 January 1944 and its personnel redeployed elsewhere.

Postwar
When the TA was reconstituted on 1 January 1947, 102nd HAA Rgt was reformed as 502 (Ulster) (Mixed) Heavy Anti-Aircraft Regiment ('Mixed' indicating that members of the Women's Royal Army Corps were now integrated into the unit). Regimental HQ was now at Ormeau Road, Belfast. It formed part of 51 (Ulster) AA Brigade (the wartime 3 AA Bde).

When AA Command was disbanded on 10 March 1955, there were wholesale mergers amongst its units. All the AA units in Northern Ireland were amalgamated into 245 (Ulster) Light Anti-Aircraft Regiment, to which 502 HAA Rgt contributed R Battery. With the reduction of the TA into the Territorial and Army Volunteer Reserve in 1967, this regiment in turn was amalgamated to form 102 (Ulster & Scottish) Light Air Defence Regiment.

Footnotes

Notes

References

 Basil Collier, History of the Second World War, United Kingdom Military Series: The Defence of the United Kingdom, London: HM Stationery Office, 1957.
 Gen Sir Martin Farndale, History of the Royal Regiment of Artillery: The Years of Defeat: Europe and North Africa, 1939–1941, Woolwich: Royal Artillery Institution, 1988/London: Brasseys, 1996, .
 J.B.M. Frederick, Lineage Book of British Land Forces 1660–1978, Vol II, Wakefield, Microform Academic, 1984, .
 Norman E.H. Litchfield, The Territorial Artillery 1908–1988 (Their Lineage, Uniforms and Badges), Nottingham: Sherwood Press, 1992, .
 Gen Sir Frederick Pile's despatch: "The Anti-Aircraft Defence of the United Kingdom from 28th July, 1939, to 15th April, 1945" London Gazette 18 December 1947
 Brig N.W. Routledge, History of the Royal Regiment of Artillery: Anti-Aircraft Artillery 1914–55, London: Royal Artillery Institution/Brassey's, 1994,

External links
 British Army units from 1945 on
 Orders of Battle at Patriot Files
 Graham Watson, The Territorial Army 1947

Heavy anti-aircraft regiments of the Royal Artillery
Military units and formations established in 1939
Military units and formations in Northern Ireland